The Battle of Cape Passaro, also known as Battle of Avola or Battle of Syracuse, was a major naval battle fought on 11 August 1718 between a fleet of the British Royal Navy under Admiral Sir George Byng and a fleet of the Spanish Navy under Rear-Admiral Antonio de Gaztañeta. It was fought off Cape Passaro, in the southern tip of the island of Sicily of which Spain had occupied. Spain and Britain were at peace, but Britain was already committed to supporting the ambitions of the Emperor Charles VI in southern Italy.

The battle was fought without a formal declaration of war but once the Spanish fired on the nearest British ships, this gave Byng his excuse to attack. The British were superior in numbers. The battle was the most significant naval action of the War of the Quadruple Alliance and resulted in a decisive victory for the British fleet, which captured or burned sixteen Spanish ships of line and frigates and several small vessels. Some of the Spanish ships were taken in the main action and some taken or burnt by their crews, who fled to the coast of Sicily. Both Castañeta and Chacón were captured. As a result of the battle the Spanish army in Sicily were thus isolated and cut off from outside help. Four months later the War of the Quadruple Alliance was formally declared.

Background

On 11 April, 1713, after the War of the Spanish Succession, the Treaty of Utrecht was signed between France and the Kingdom of Great Britain, the United Provinces, the Kingdom of Prussia, the Kingdom of Portugal and the Duchy of Savoy. It marked the end of the Spanish Empire in Europe, as the Spanish Netherlands, the Kingdom of Naples, the Duchy of Milan and Sardinia were ceded to Austria, the Kingdom of Sicily to Savoy, Gelderland to the Kingdom of Prussia, and Minorca and Gibraltar to Great Britain. France had succeeded in placing a king of her own royal house on a neighbouring throne, but the ambitions expressed in the wars of Louis XIV had been defeated and the European system based on the balance of power largely directed by Britain was preserved.

The British gains at the expense of the French and Spanish allowed it to strengthen her naval power. Gibraltar and Port Mahon in the Mediterranean and the colonies of Nova Scotia and Newfoundland in North America proved useful to extend and protect British trade. In comparison, the Spanish navy was old and many of their ships needed refitting. Philip ordered more shipbuilding to commence in the American and Spanish shipyards. The major political figure Cardinal Giulio Alberoni, who had come from the Duchy of Parma proceeded to reorganise the royal administration. Alberoni had promised Philip to put Spain in a strong position to recover Sicily and Naples if there were five years of peace. Alberoni was even willing to help Philip V to overthrow the Regent of France, Philip of Orleans, and alienate that country in order to grant trade benefits to Britain with the aim of isolating Austria.

The British monarch George I, who was also Elector of Hanover, felt threatened by Alberoni who thought he would undermine the power of Emperor Charles VI. Alberoni on hearing this withdrew all claims. This, together with Philip's claims over the French throne, turned Great Britain and France against Spain. Both countries, jointly with the United Provinces, had formed the so-called Triple Alliance a year before to maintain the balance of power in the continent. Meanwhile, both Austria and Spain were at loggerheads over Sicily. The British statesmen preferred the island to be ceded to their former ally rather than Spain. France, under the weakness of Philip of Orleans agreed, and it was proposed to modify the Treaty of Utrecht and force Victor Amadeus II of Savoy to exchange Sicily for Sardinia. The detention of the Spanish Grand Inquisitor José Molinés at Milan however by orders of the Emperor gave Spain a pretext to initiate military hostilities in Italy.

Prelude
On 22 July 1717, a large Spanish fleet set sail from Barcelona with an army led by the Flemish nobleman Lieutenant General Jean François de Bette, Marquis of Lede. This force then captured the island of Sardinia. At the same time negotiations had ensued between Austria, Spain, and France in order to avoid a war. The British and French envoys at the same time offered Philip V the Duchies of Parma and Tuscany, and also to renounce Charles VI's claim to the Spanish throne, if Philip abandoned Sicily and accepted Sardinia. In view of Alberoni's negatives, even Gibraltar was offered. The Cardinal was strengthening Spain's position in Europe by forming an alliance with Russia and Sweden, with the aim of restoring the House of Stuart to the British throne.

Byng sent to the Mediterranean

In the early months of 1718 a large number of Royal Naval vessels began to be commissioned and refitted; this alarmed the Spanish ambassador, the Marquis of Monteleon. Admiral George Byng, a man of long experience, was appointed Commander-in-Chief of the Mediterranean on 24 March. He was, upon his arrival there to inform the King of Spain, the Viceroy of Naples (at that time Count Wirich Philipp von Daun) and the Governor of Milan (the Prince Maximilian Karl of Löwenstein–Wertheim), that he had been sent to settle the differences between Spain and Austria.

Byng set sail from Spithead on 15 June with a fleet of twenty ships of line, two fireships, two bomb vessels, a store ship, a hospital ship and two tenders. On 30 June he arrived at Cádiz and sent a letter to the British ambassador at Madrid, William Stanhope, informing Philip V of the presence of the British fleet. Alberoni wrote Byng that if he attacked the Spanish fleet he should prepare for a humiliating defeat. Stanhope replied that Britain was acting only as a mediator. Nine days later, Alberoni wrote to Stanhope that Byng would execute his sovereign's orders.

Byng resumed his voyage and by 8 July the British fleet was rejoined off Cape Spartel by the two ships with news of the Spanish fleets departure from Barcelona on 18 June. Byng was joined by Vice-admiral Charles Cornwall with a small division of two ships from Gibraltar, HMS Argyll and HMS Charles Galley. On 23 July Byng anchored off Port-Mahon and while reinforcing the garrison there was told that the Spanish fleet had been seen on 30 June off Naples. Two days later, the British fleet set sail, arriving at the Bay of Naples on 1 August.

Spanish invasion of Sicily
On 18 June a Spanish expedition sailed from Barcelona consisting of twelve ships of line, seventeen frigates, seven galleys, two fireships, and two bomb vessels, plus 276 transports and 123 tartanes commanded by Admiral Antonio de Gaztañeta and the General Quartermaster of the Spanish navy, José Patiño Rosales. This fleet carried aboard 36,000 infantrymen and 8,000 horse, along with artillery, supplies, and ammunition again under the command of Marquis of Lede. Their objective was the island of Sicily. On 30 June, having embarked reinforcements at the Bay of Cagliari between 25 and 27 June, the Spanish fleet came in sight of the city of Palermo. The Austrian force, surprised by Spanish numbers, evacuated Palermo. A month later, most of the island had fallen to the Spaniards with little or nor resistance, with the exception of Messina and a few coastal fortresses.

As Victor Amadeus II of Savoy had agreed to surrender Sicily to the Emperor, the Austrian Viceroy of Naples, Wirich Philipp von Daun, asked Byng to transport 2,000 German infantry under General Wetzel to the citadel of Messina. Byng agreed and sailed from Naples on 6 August, while the Spanish fleet was anchored off Paradiso.

Byng also proposed a "cessation of arms" in Sicily for two months, but Lede declined. With this offer rejected, Byng was left with no choice but to help the Imperialists and Savoyards resist Spanish attack. The British fleet arrived at Messina but were discovered by a Spanish felucca on 8 August, heading to the point of the Faro. The Marquis of Mari warned Gaztañeta and Patiño of the inferiority of the Spanish fleet, and the Irish-born Squadron Chief George Cammock, a former officer in the British Royal Navy, proposed that the fleet anchor in the Paradiso roadstead where it could be assisted with shore batteries. This defensive position would, according to Cammock, favour the Spanish ships, as the strong currents of the Faro would throw Byng over them, thus avoiding a feared long-range cannonade. Gaztañeta and Patiño, however, were confident of the peaceful intentions of Byng due to Alberoni's letters, and they decided to sail to Malta to join forces with Baltasar de Guevara.

Battle

Fight against the Spanish rear

The Spanish fleet sailed from the Faro Point in disorder. No defensive disposition was taken by Gaztañeta, except to leave behind two frigates to follow the British fleet at a distance. As Byng stood in off Faro Point, both ships were detected. At the same time, a felucca from the Calabrian coast informed the British admiral that the Spanish fleet had been seen from the hills laying in. Byng dispatched German troops they were carrying to Reggio under escort of two of his ships while he headed to Faro point and sent scouts ahead. At noon they discovered the Spanish fleet, drawn into a line of battle: 27 ships of the line and frigates, two fireships, four bomb-vessels, seven galleys, and several storeships. Byng followed them during the rest of the day. A Spanish account of the battle said that, on the morning of 10 August, the Spanish ships saluted the British ones as they approached, not showing, therefore, any sign of belligerence. The night passed with fair weather; small winds and sometimes calm. The following morning the Spanish fleet was dispersed, with ships divided into three large groups separated from each other. Gaztañeta tried then to form a line of battle by towing his ships of the line with the galleys, but had no time.

The Marquis of Mari, who commanded the Spanish rear, had under his command various warships: the ship of line El Real, the frigates San Isidro, Tigre, Águila de Nantes, two bomb-vessels, a fireship, and some storeships, besides the galley squadron. Mari had lagged behind and was near the shore off Avola. HMS Argyll fired two shots near De Mari's El Real, while Canterbury fired three more. Then, Mari's ship returned fire and the battle ensued with British at an advantage. The Marquis, having his ship badly mauled by the British gunfire, resolved to drive his squadron ashore, and later set fire to the ships to avoid capture. His own ship sustained fifty casualties, killed and wounded, and had her rigging severely damaged. She was run aground and her crew escaped inland, but the ship was refloated by her British captors. Two of the Spanish frigates were completely burned; their crews also escaped. Sorpresa, under Captain Miguel de Sada, was the only ship which offered battle, but were forced to surrender, having sustained heavy damage and casualties. The other Spanish vessels struck their colours after a brief engagement, following which the British took possession of them.

Attack on the Spanish centre

With the Spanish rear now severed from the main fleet, Byng committed most of his vessels in pursuing Gaztañeta's squadron, which continued its way towards Cape Passaro. The Spanish admiral had with him six ships of the line and four frigates, but had not succeeded in forming a line of battle. HMS Oxford and HMS Grafton were the first two British ships of the line to engage Gaztañeta's centre. At 10 am, as they approached, the disorganised Spanish vessels opened fire. The two British ships returned fired, having been ordered by Byng not to fire until the Spaniards repeated their firing. Oxford fell upon the 64-gun Santa Rosa and took her after a murderous cannonade, supported by other British ships in the distance. The 60-gun San Carlos struck her colours to Captain Thomas Matthews' HMS Kent, having made little resistance. Captain Nicholas Haddock's Grafton, meanwhile, confronted Príncipe de Asturias (formerly HMS Cumberland), together with HMS Breda and HMS Captain. Príncipe de Asturias was left almost shattered by Grafton and had most of her crew killed or injured, including Chacón, who was wounded in the face by splinters. The ship surrendered to Breda and Captain while Grafton moved to engage another Spanish ship of sixty guns on his starboard.

At 1 pm, Gaztañeta's flagship, the 74-gun San Felipe, was attacked by Kent and soon after by Superb, from which she received two broadsides. A running fight took place for two hours between the Spanish admiral's ship, supported by three others, and Byng's division of seven ships of line and a fireship. Gaztañeta held off his pursuers until Kent, bearing down under his stern, fired a broadside and fell to the leeward while Superb fell simultaneously on his weather-quarter. San Felipe, which could only return fire with her after guns, was left dismasted and had its hull severely mauled, but Gaztañeta was unwilling to surrender. Byng's HMS Barfleur came close to San Felipe, and Byng demanded that Gaztañeta strike his colours or Byng would dispatch one of his fireships against San Felipe. Gaztañeta refused and responded with a broadside. The British fired back and he received a shot which pierced his left leg and wounded his right heel. Volante, commanded by Captain Antonio Escudero, attempted to relieve San Felipe. staying close to her with the aim to attract some of the British fire upon herself. Pierced by the fire of three British ships, she struck to HMS Montague and HMS Rupert at nightfall. San Felipe, having 200 men out of action, amongst them flag captain Pedro Dexpois, who had been hit by the shattered bones of a sailor cut in half by a cannonball, also surrendered. Of the remaining ships of Gaztañeta's squadron, Juno meanwhile had been taken by HMS Essex after a three-hour fight.

Guevara's arrival and retreat
In almost total darkness, Gaztañeta's San Felipe struck her colours. Baltasar de Guevara, in San Luis with another ship of line, came in sight of the Spanish flagship, which had been alerted by the gunfire. Guevara's two ships bore down windward of them and exchanged a broadside with Byng's Barfleur. Told that San Felipe had surrendered, Guevara charged upon the wind and committed himself to collect the few Spanish ships still fighting on. The frigate Perla under Captain Gabriel Alderete, was relieved and allowed to escape from the three British ships. Together with another frigate, San Juan el Chicho, they left the battle, and headed towards Malta. Byng pursued them for some time, but given the fading light and low wind, he decided to stay with his fleet. George Cammock, convinced of the defeat, set sail to the Venetian island of Corfu with his flagship San Fernando and a frigate.

Francisco Grimau's seven galleys, taking advantage of favourable winds, retired to Palermo. The ships which managed to escape were, besides the galleys, four ships of the line, nine frigates, a bomb galley, and one of Pintado's ships. The 64-gun Santa Isabel, under Captain Andrea Reggio, was pursued all through the night and surrendered the next morning to Rear Admiral George Delaval. The British, in contrast, sustained trifling damage with no more than 500 killed or wounded all told. Of Byng's fleet, the ship which suffered the most damage was Grafton; but she had engaged and disabled several Spanish vessels. The necessary repairs of the Royal Navy ships, mostly in the rigging, and those relating to prizes taken, were done over the following days. On 18 August Byng received a letter from Captain Walton:

End of the battle
Walton had succeeded in capturing, by his own account, four men-of-war, a bomb vessel and a storeship in addition to burning four other men-of-war. Having repaired his damaged ships, Byng entered the port of Syracuse, then held by Savoyard troops under the Count of Maffei and blockaded by the Spanish army. From there Byng dispatched five captured Spanish ships of the line and four Spanish frigates to Port-Mahon under a heavy escort. One of his ships, Gaztañeta's San Felipe, took fire accidentally and blew up with most of his crew; 160 British and 50 Spaniards. According to Spanish accounts, shortly after the action, a captain of the British fleet made a complaint to the Marquis of Lede in the name of Byng, stating that the Spaniards had fired first. Gaztañeta and his officers were dispatched to Augusta in a felucca, having taken an oath not to take up arms against the Habsburg armies for four months. Of the haul of Spanish prisoners taken – 2,600 who were wounded or sick, were also freed. Of the Spanish ships which escaped to Malta, where the Sicilian galleys under the Marquis of Rivaroles were still anchored. The Grand Master of the Knights Hospitaller, the Catalan Ramon Perellos y Roccaful, was a sympathiser of the House of Habsburg and refused entry to the Spanish.

Aftermath

Having achieved his goal of destroying or capturing the bulk of Spanish fleet, Byng, then anchored at Malta. He was resolved to commit all his efforts to lift the Siege of Messina but to his surprise, even though German reinforcements broke through to the citadel, the Marquis d'Andorno surrendered on 29 September. The Marquis of Lede then held all of Sicily except the towns of Syracuse, Melazzo, and Trapani, held by considerable Savoyard garrisons for the following months. Byng detached four of his ships to eliminate Cammock's surviving ships and blockade the Spanish army. In the harbour of Augusta, the British attacked a convoy of small vessels and forced the Spaniards to burn a bomb vessel and a fireship. Off Palermo, HMS Grafton captured two Genoese vessels which had sailed from Porto Longone with a corps of Swiss mercenaries, munitions, and gunpowder. A third vessel ran aground when approached by HMS Lennox near Castellammare del Golfo and was set on fire, though its crew managed to land 240 men, 700 flintlocks and some gunpowder.

As Byng's attack had virtually destroyed the Spanish fleet at Cape Passaro, the Spanish situation at Sicily considerably worsened over the months following the battle. Their army was isolated on the island, so the War Ministry informed Lede that they couldn't send troops or supplies. The blow was felt so severe by Alberoni that he banned the circulation of any information on the expedition and took measures against Great Britain, although he did not immediately declare war. He requested that ambassador Monteleone was to leave London and gave orders to issue letters of marque to privateers and to seize all British vessels and goods in the ports of Spain. This was a task in which Baltasar de Guevera played a major role when he entered the port of Cádiz with his few surviving ships. In the meantime, Byng sent his eldest son to England with a full account of the battle. When he was at Naples in November, he received a letter written personally by Emperor Charles VI:

On 26 December Great Britain declared war on Spain, France did the same soon after on 9 January the following year. In spite of the unfavourable turn of events, Alberoni was even more unwilling than at first to accept the terms dictated by the Quadruple alliance. To reverse the course of the war, Alberoni began to collect armaments and shipping at Cádiz and Corunna for an expedition to Britain itself. He sought alliance with King Charles XII of Sweden, he obtained the support of the Jacobite pretender, James Francis Edward Stuart. His plan was an invasion of the western England by 5,000 men under British turncoat James Butler, 2nd Duke of Ormonde. To deter Swedish involvement, Britain dispatched a squadron of ten ships of the line led by John Norris to the Baltic. The Swedish ships remained at their ports, and no naval action took place. Moreover, on 11 December Charles XII was killed by a cannonball at the Siege of Fredriksten, and Spain was deprived of its only potential ally. Alberoni decided to continue the project and entrusted the command of the fleet destined to England to Baltasar de Guevara. Off Cape Finisterre the expedition was dispersed in a long and violent storm which sank several ships and scattered the fleet. Three frigates and five transports with troops reached Scotland and disembarked about 400 men, but they were soon defeated at the Battle of Glenshiel.

Order of battle

Britain (Admiral Sir George Byng) 
 Barfleur 90 (flag of Admiral Sir George Byng, 1st Captain George Saunders, 2nd Captain Richard Lestock)
 Shrewsbury 80 (Vice-Admiral Charles Cornwall, Captain John Balchen)
 Dorsetshire 80 (Rear-Admiral George Delaval, Captain John Furzer)
 Breda 70 (Barrow Harris)
 Burford 70 (Charles Vanbrugh)
 Captain 70 (Archibald Hamilton)
 Essex 70 (Richard Rowzier)
 Grafton 70 (Nicholas Haddock)
 Kent 70 (Thomas Mathews)
 Lenox 70 (Charles Strickland)
 Orford 70 (Edward Falkingham)
 Royal Oak 70 (Thomas Kempthorne)
 Canterbury 60 (George Walton)
 Dreadnought 60 (William Haddock)
 Dunkirk 60 (Francis Drake)
 Montagu 60 (Thomas Beverley)
 Rippon 60 (Christopher O'Brien)
 Rupert 60 (Arthur Field)
 Superb 60 (Streynsham Master)
 Rochester 50 (Joseph Winder)
 Argyll 50 (Conningsby Norbury)
 Charles Galley 44 (Philip Vanbrugh)

Total was 1 of 90 guns, 2 of 80 guns, 9 of 70 guns, 7 of 60 guns, 2 of 50 guns, 1 of 44 guns. The British fleet also comprised 6 smaller vessels – the fireships Garland (Samuel Atkins) and Griffin (Humphrey Orme), the storeship Success (Francis Knighton), the hospital ship Looe (Timothy Splaine), the bomb-ketch Basilisk (John Hubbard) and an unnamed bomb tender.

Spain (Rear-Admiral Don José Antonio de Gaztañeta) 
 Real San Felipe (San Felipe El Real) 74 (Rear-Admiral Antonio de Gaztañeta, flag captain Pedro Dexpois) – Captured by Superbe and Kent, blew up after being towed to Mahon
 Príncipe de Asturias 70 (Rear-Admiral Francisco Chacón (†)) – Captured by Breda and Captain
 San Juan Bautista 60 (Don Francisco Guerrero) – Escaped to Malta.
 San Luis 60 (Rear-Admiral Don Baltasar Vélez de Guevara) – Escaped to Malta.
 San Pedro 60 (Don Antonio de Arizaga) – Escaped
 San Carlos 60 (Prince de Chalois) – Captured by Kent
 Real Mazi (El Real) 60 (Rear-Admiral Marquiss de Mari) – Captured by Canterburys division
 San Fernando 60 (Rear-Admiral George Cammocke) – Escaped to Malta
 Santa Isabel / San Isabel 60 (Don Andrea Reggio) – Captured by Dorsetshire
 Santa Rosa 60 (Don Antonio González) – Captured by Orford
 Perla de España 54 (Don Gabriel de Alderete) – Escaped to Malta
 San Isidro 46 (Don Manuel de Villavicencio) – Captured by Canterburys division
 Hermione 44 (Don Rodrigo de Torres) – Escaped, but then burnt at Messina
 Volante 44 (Don Antonio Escudero) – Captured by Montagu and Rupert
 Esperanza 46 (Don Juan Maria Delfin) – Burnt to avoid capture
 Juno 36 (Don Pedro Moyano) – Captured by Essex
 Sorpresa 36 (Don Miguel de Sada, count of Clavijo) – Captured by Canterburys division
 Galera 30 (Don Francisco Álvarez Barreiro) – Escaped
 Castilla 30 (Don Francisco de Liaño) – Escaped
 Conde de Tolosa 30 (Don José de Goycoechea) – Escaped, but then captured at Messina
 Tigre 26 (M Cavaigne) – Captured
 Águila 24 (Don Lucas Masnata) – Captured by Canterburys division
 San Francisco de Asís 22 – Escaped
 San Fernando Menor 20 – Escaped
 San Juan Menor 20 (Don Ignacio Valevale) – Escaped, but captured later
 Flecha 18 (Don Juan Papagena) – Escaped

Total was one 74-gun, 1 70-gun, 8 60-gun, 1 54-gun, 2 46-gun, 2 44-gun, 2 36-gun, 3 30-gun, one 26-gun, one 24-gun, one 22-gun, two 20-gun, and one 18-gun. The Spanish fleet also included three bomb ships, a fireship, one ordnance store ship, three ordinary store ships, a settee, and seven galleys.

See also 
 Kingdom of Sicily under Savoy

References 
Citations

Bibliography
 
 
 
 
 
 
 
 
 

Conflicts in 1718
Cape Passaro 1718
Cape Passaro 1718
Cape Passaro